Grundarfjörður Airport  is an airport serving Grundarfjörður, Iceland.

See also
Transport in Iceland
List of airports in Iceland

References

 Google Earth

External links
 OurAirports - Grundarfjörður
 OpenStreetMap - Grundarfjörður
 Grundarfjörður Airport

Airports in Iceland
Grundarfjörður